Mohl or von Mohl is a surname. It may refer to:

 Aleksander Piotr Mohl (1899 –1954), Polish military and intelligence officer and diplomat
 Bertel Møhl (1936 - 2017), Danish marine zoologist and physiologist
 Dávid Mohl, Hungarian football player
 Ernst Friedrich von Mohl (July 20, 1849 – January 8, 1929), German classical philologist and professor
 Hugo von Mohl (1805–1872), German botanist
 Julius von Mohl (1800–1876), German orientalist
  Mary Elizabeth Mohl (22 February 1793 – 15 May 1883) was a British writer who was known as a salon hostess in Paris
 Ottmar von Mohl (1846–1922), German diplomat
 Robert von Mohl (1799–1875), German jurist

See also
  Mount Mohl, Antarctica
 Mol (disambiguation)
 Moll (disambiguation)